Eugène-Gabriel-Gervais-Laurent Tisserant (24 March 1884 – 21 February 1972) was a French prelate and cardinal of the Catholic Church. Elevated to the cardinalate in 1936, Tisserant was a prominent and long-time member of the Roman Curia.

Early life and ordination
Tisserant was born in Nancy to Hippolyte and Octavée (née Connard) Tisserant. From 1900 to 1904, he studied theology, Sacred Scripture, Hebrew, Syriac, Old Testament, and Oriental Patrology at the seminary in Nancy.  He was reportedly fluent in thirteen languages: Amharic, Arabic, Akkadian, English, French (native language), German, Greek, Hebrew, Italian, Latin, Persian, Russian and Syriac. He then studied in Jerusalem under Marie-Joseph Lagrange, O.P., but returned to France in 1905 for military service.

On 4 August 1907, Tisserant was ordained a priest by Charles-François Turinaz, Bishop of Nancy.

Professor and prelate
Tisserant served as a professor at the Pontifical Roman Athenaeum S. Apollinare and curator at the Vatican Library from 1908 to 1914, at which time he became an intelligence officer in the French Army during World War I. Named assistant librarian of the Vatican Library in 1919 and Monsignor in 1921, Tisserant became Pro-Prefect of the Vatican Library on 15 November 1930 and was named a protonotary apostolic on 13 January 1936.

Cardinal and curial appointments
In the consistory of 15 June 1936, Tisserant was created Cardinal Deacon by Pope Pius XI, assigned as his titular church the Basilica of Santi Vito, Modesto e Crescenzia. He was raised to the rank of Cardinal Priest soon afterwards, retaining the same title.

On 25 June 1937, Tisserant was appointed the Titular Archbishop of Iconium by Pope Pius XI. he received his consecration on the following 25 July from Cardinal Eugenio Pacelli (later Pope Pius XII), with Archbishop Giuseppe Migone and Bishop Charles-Joseph-Eugène Ruch serving as co-consecrators, in St. Peter's Basilica. He participated in the conclave of 1939, which elected Pacelli as Pope Pius XII. With the new pontiff's permission, he switched from his titular church to that of Santa Maria sopra Minerva.

Tisserant held a number of offices in the Roman Curia. He served as secretary of the Congregation for the Oriental Churches (1936–1959), as president of the Pontifical Biblical Commission (1938–1946) and as Prefect of the Congregation of Ceremonies (1951–1967). From 1957 to 1971, he served as Librarian and Archivist of the Holy Roman Church. Under Pius XII, Tisserant also headed a commission to investigate alleged abuses of appointments in the Order of Malta, which concluded that there was no wrongdoing.

In 1939, Tisserant urged Pius XII to promulgate an encyclical "on the duty of Catholics to resist the unjust orders of an authoritarian state." After the outbreak of World War II, Pius XII refused to release Tisserant as the head of the Vatican Library, preventing him from returning to France to serve in the army.

In 1946, Tisserant was elevated to the rank of Cardinal Bishop by Pope Pius, taking the title of Porto e Santa Rufina in 1946. After serving as vice-dean of the College of Cardinals from 1947 to 1951, he became dean and Cardinal Bishop of Ostia on 13 January 1951. As dean of the Sacred College, he presided at the Funeral Masses of Popes Pius XII and John XXIII and presided over the conclaves to elect their successors in the conclaves of 1958 and 1963. During the 1958 conclave, he was seen as papabile by most Vatican-watchers, and it is generally believed that he received at least five votes in the early balloting.

In 1956, Tisserant received an honorary doctorate from Coimbra University, and in 1961, he was elected a member of the Académie Française.

Second Vatican Council and beyond
From 1962 to 1965, Tisserant attended the Second Vatican Council and sat on its Board of Presidency. As Dean of the College of Cardinals, he was the celebrant of the Mass coram Summo Pontifice at the opening ceremony of the council, before the Pope delivered the council's opening address and the other rites specific to the opening of a general council were performed.

He is said to have participated in negotiating a secret 1960s agreement between Soviet and Vatican officials that authorised Eastern Orthodox participation in the Second Vatican Council in exchange for a noncondemnation of atheistic communism during the conciliar assemblies. As Dean of the Sacred College, he was the first person after Pope Paul VI to sign each of the acts of the Second Vatican Council.

In 1962, Tisserant became Grand Master of the Order of the Holy Sepulchre, a position that he held until his death.

In 1969 Tisserant demanded a retraction from Cardinal Leo Joseph Suenens, Archbishop of Brussels-Mechelen, for the "defamatory and slanderous" statements that he allegedly made against the bureaucracy of the Roman Curia.

In 1970, when Pope Paul VI restricted the right to vote in papal conclaves to cardinals under age 80, Tisserant, then 86, objected that each cardinal's health should determine his fitness and suggested that 73-year-old Paul VI seemed frail.

Death
Tisserant died in 1972 from a heart attack in Albano Laziale, at age 87. Pope Paul VI took part in his funeral service.

He is buried in the Basilica of Porto e Santa Rufina in Rome.

See also
Cardinal electors in Papal conclave, 1939
Cardinal electors in Papal conclave, 1958
Cardinal electors in Papal conclave, 1963

References

Further reading

Carroll, Rory and Goñi, Uki. 2008. "The Hunt for Doctor Death". The Guardian (London) 8 January.

External links
 Catholic-Hierarchy

 Rory Carroll and Uki Goni on the hunt in Argentina for Aribert Heim, the last of the Nazis

1884 births
1972 deaths
Clergy from Nancy, France
Pope Pius XI
Deans of the College of Cardinals
Cardinal-bishops of Ostia
Cardinal-bishops of Porto
20th-century French cardinals
20th-century Roman Catholic titular archbishops
French Roman Catholic archbishops
French Roman Catholic titular bishops
Participants in the Second Vatican Council
Members of the Congregation for the Oriental Churches
Pontifical Biblical Commission
Members of the Académie des Inscriptions et Belles-Lettres
Members of the Académie Française
Grand Masters of the Order of the Holy Sepulchre
Grand Crosses 1st class of the Order of Merit of the Federal Republic of Germany
Corresponding Fellows of the Medieval Academy of America